Radovan "Bata" Radović (19 January 1936 – 25 August 2022) was a Serbian basketball player and coach. He represented the Yugoslavia national basketball team internationally.

Playing career 
Radović played for two Belgrade teams the BSK and the Partizan in Yugoslav First League.

He started his basketball career playing with the youth teams of the BSK. In 1954, he was promoted to first team. Few years later he moved to Partizan where he has played for Partizan from 1957 to 1968, missed only 1964 season due to the compulsory military service. In 1963, he recorded a career-high 48 points in a game.

National team career
As a player for the Yugoslavia national basketball team Radović participated at the 1960 Summer Olympics in Rome and at the EuroBasket 1961 in Belgrade where he won a silver medal. He participated at the EuroBasket 1959 in Turkey. Also, he won a gold medal at the 1959 Mediterranean Games in Lebanon and bronze medal at the 1963 Mediterranean Games in Italy.

Radović was a flag bearer for Yugoslavia at the 1960 Summer Olympics in Rome, Italy.

Coaching career 
Radović coached the Partizan Belgrade of the Yugoslav First League in 1969–70 and 1970–71 season. During his military service in Kraljevo in 1964, he briefly trained a future star Ljubodrag Simonović.

See also 
 List of KK Partizan head coaches
 List of flag bearers for Yugoslavia at the Olympics
 KK Partizan accomplishments and records

References

External links
 Radovan Radović at sports-reference.com

1936 births
2022 deaths
Basketball players at the 1960 Summer Olympics
Competitors at the 1959 Mediterranean Games
Competitors at the 1963 Mediterranean Games
Mediterranean Games bronze medalists for Yugoslavia
Mediterranean Games gold medalists for Yugoslavia
KK Partizan players
KK Partizan coaches
OKK Beograd players
Olympic basketball players of Yugoslavia
Serbian men's basketball players
Serbian men's basketball coaches
People from Kučevo
Yugoslav men's basketball players
Yugoslav basketball coaches
Mediterranean Games medalists in basketball
Centers (basketball)